The Delaware Capitol Police was founded as a three-man unit in 1965 to deter vandalism at the Legislative Hall, in Dover, Delaware. The unit was originally known as Capitol Security.

Responsibilities were eventually expanded to cover other state-owned properties in Delaware while the unit remained unfunded (being maintained through donations and transfer of equipment from other law enforcement agencies).  Officers initially received no formal training and were armed only with a nightstick, handcuffs and tear gas.

In 1974, Delaware Director of Administrative Services Thomas Murray overhauled the organization, providing basic law-enforcement training. Having been sworn in as constables, the officers now had the power of arrest on state property.  New equipment and uniforms were issued at this time and the organization became known as the Capitol Security Police.

In 1980 the organization adopted its current name. Arrest powers were expanded statewide in 1982. Further changes in 1995 saw a redesign of the patch worn by officers and integration of communications systems with the Delaware State Police in order to improve response times to emergencies.

In 2020 the Delaware Capitol Police patch was updated with a new design which is now worn by all Police personnel.

Rank structure

Duties

The Delaware Capitol Police are a statewide law enforcement agency responsible for the security of all three branches of state government throughout the State of Delaware. Specifically, the Delaware Capitol Police provide services to Woodburn (Governor's Mansion), Legislative Hall, Capitol Complex (Legislative Mall), Supreme Court, Superior Court, Chancery Court, Court of Common Pleas and the Family Courts in all three counties, the Carvel State Building and over 80 state controlled facilities and/or properties in the greater Dover area.

All Delaware Capitol Police officers are certified by the Delaware Council on Police Training and have statewide jurisdiction and arrest authority. Our officers take great pride in ensuring the safety and security of the Governor, state legislators, legislative staff, the Delaware Judiciary, state employees, citizens and visitors to the State of Delaware. We act in conjunction with other municipal, county, state and federal law enforcement agencies to ensure that the best possible service is provided.

Operations
The Delaware Capitol Police maintains police officers and security officers in all three of Delaware's counties servicing all three branches of state government.  DCP headquarters is located within the Tatnall Building in Dover. The Delaware Capitol Police also maintains three explosive detection canine teams and 5 detectives.

The Northern Operation services:
 Leonard L. Williams Justice Center
 Carvel State Building
 Renaissance Office Complex
 Delaware Medical Examiner Office
 900 King street Building

The Central Operation services:
 Delaware Legislative Hall
 Tatnall Building
 Delaware Governor's Mansion (Woodburn)
 Dover Patrol Section (servicing over 80 separate state facilities) Formerly called the Kent County Patrol.
 Kent County Courthouse
 Kent County Family Court

The Southern Operation services:
 Sussex County Courthouse
 Sussex County Family Court
 Sussex County Court of Chancery

The Special Operation Services:
 Canine Unit
 CRASE Unit
 CVSA Unit
 Firearms Unit
 Honor Guard Unit
 Quartermaster
 Recruitment Unit
 Special Investigations Unit

Delaware Capitol Security
Delaware Capitol Police employs Security Officers who operate the magnetometers and x-ray machines at the entrances to the courthouses, Legislative Hall, and the Carvel State Building. They are responsible for the screening, and if necessary the searching, of employees, visitors, and packages entering the courthouse. Capitol Security Officers are trained in the use of magnetometers, x-ray machines, handcuffing, defensive aerosol sprays, and certified in performing CPR, using AED's (automatic external defibrillator), and providing First Aid. Senior Security Officers are Capitol Security Officers who attend one of the seasonal police officer training courses provided by a Delaware police agency under the guidelines established by the Delaware Council on Police Training. Once completed they become Senior Security Officers and after being sworn in are granted the legal authority to detain individuals while in the performance of their official duties. Senior Security Officers are recognized by the dark blue sleeve worn on the epaulets of their uniform shirts.

See also

List of law enforcement agencies in Delaware
Capitol police

References

External links
Delaware Capitol Police Website
Delaware Capitol Police History

State law enforcement agencies of Delaware
Specialist police departments of Delaware
Dover, Delaware
Capitol police